is the current Chairman and CEO of eAccess and eMobile, a Japanese telecommunication company. On March 24, 2009, he was also appointed as a director to the Telecom Corporation of New Zealand Limited.

Semmoto has also served on the Board of Directors for Softbank and the Sega Corporation. Semmoto received his bachelor's degree from Kyoto University and his M.S. and Ph.D. degrees from the University of Florida.

References

External links
eAccess千本社長が上場会見、「FTTHが主流になると考えるのは間違い」 (in Japanese)
eAccess web site (in English)
イー・アクセス (Ii akusesu) on the Japanese Wikipedia

University of Florida alumni
Living people
1942 births
Japanese businesspeople
People from Nara Prefecture
Sega people
SoftBank people